Philipp Wilbrand Jacob Müller (4 October 1771, Odenbach (Glan), Pfalz–1851, Odenbach an der Glan) was a German entomologist who specialised in Coleoptera.

He was a Reformed Church  priest.

Works
1817 Müller, P.W.J. 1817. Bemerkung über einige Insekten. Magazin der Entomologie 2: 266–289.
1818 Müller, P.W.J. 1818. Beiträge zur Naturgeschichte der Gattung Claviger. Magazine der Entomologie 3: 69–112.
1821 Müller, P.W.J. 1821. III. Neue Insekten. In: Germar’s E.: Magazin der Entomologie 4: 184–230.
1822 Müller, P.W.J. & Kunze, G. 1822. Monographie der Ameisenkäfer (Scydmaenus Latreille). Schriften der Naturforschenden Gesellschaft zu Leipzig 1: 175–204.

References
Hoch, W. 1959: [Muller, P. W. J.] Tagungsbericht Arbeitsgemeinschaft Rheinischer Coleopterologen, Köln 53, pp. 5–6
Niehuis, M. 2012: Pfarrer Philipp Wilbrand Jacob Müller (* 4. Oktober 1771 - + 31. März 1851) ein bedeutender Insektenkundler aus Odenbach a. Glan. Mainzer Naturwissenschaftliches Archiv, Mainz (Beiheft 33): 11915
Westwood, J. O. 1852-1853: [Muller, P. W. J.] (The) Transactions of the Entomological Society of London for the Year ..., London 2 (2), pp. 53–54

German entomologists
1771 births
1851 deaths
Coleopterists